Social computing is an area of computer science that is concerned with the intersection of social behavior and computational systems. It is based on creating or recreating social conventions and social contexts through the use of software and technology. Thus, blogs, email, instant messaging, social network services, wikis, social bookmarking and other instances of what is often called social software illustrate ideas from social computing.

History 
Social computing begins with the observation that humans—and human behavior—are profoundly social. From birth, humans orient to one another, and as they grow, they develop abilities for interacting with each other. This ranges from expression and gesture to spoken and written language. As a consequence, people are remarkably sensitive to the behavior of those around them and make countless decisions that are shaped by their social context. Whether it's wrapping up a talk when the audience starts fidgeting, choosing the crowded restaurant over the nearly deserted one, or crossing the street against the light because everyone else is doing so, social information provides a basis for inferences, planning, and coordinating activity.

The premise of 'Social Computing' is that it is possible to design digital systems that support useful functionality by making socially produced information available to their users. This information may be provided directly, as when systems show the number of users who have rated a review as helpful or not. Or the information may be provided after being filtered and aggregated, as is done when systems recommend a product based on what else people with similar purchase history have purchased. Alternatively, the information may be provided indirectly, as is the case with Google's page rank algorithms which orders search results based on the number of pages that (recursively) point to them. In all of these cases, information that is produced by a group of people is used to provide or enhance the functioning of a system. Social computing is concerned with systems of this sort and the mechanisms and principles that underlie them.

Social computing can be defined as follows:

    "Social Computing" refers to systems that support the gathering, representation, processing, use, and dissemination of information that is distributed across social collectivities such as teams, communities, organizations, and markets. Moreover, the information is not "anonymous" but is significantly precise because it is linked to people, who are in turn linked to other people.

More recent definitions, however, have foregone the restrictions regarding anonymity of information, acknowledging the continued spread and increasing pervasiveness of social computing. As an example, Hemmatazad, N. (2014) defined social computing as "the use of computational devices to facilitate or augment the social interactions of their users, or to evaluate those interactions in an effort to obtain new information."

PLATO may be the earliest example of social computing in a live production environment with initially hundreds and soon thousands of users, on the PLATO computer system based in the University of Illinois at Urbana Champaign in 1973, when social software applications for multi-user chat rooms, group message forums, and instant messaging appeared all within that year. In 1974, email was made available as well as the world's first online newspaper called NewsReport, which supported content submitted by the user community as well as written by editors and reporters.

Social computing has to do with supporting "computations" that are carried out by groups of people, an idea that has been popularized in James Surowiecki's book, The Wisdom of Crowds. Examples of social computing in this sense include collaborative filtering, online auctions, prediction markets, reputation systems, computational social choice, tagging, and verification games. The social information processing page focuses on this sense of social computing.

Background

Technology infrastructure

The idea to engage users using websites to interact was first brought forth by Web 2.0 and was an advancement from Web 1.0 where according to Cormode, G. and Krishnamurthy, B. (2008): "content creators were few in Web 1.0 with the vast majority of users simply acting as consumers of content."

Web 2.0 provided functionalities that allowed for low cost web-hosting services and introduced features with browser windows that used basic information structure and expanded it to as many devices as possible using HTTP.

By 2006, Of particular interest in the realm of social computing is social software for enterprise. Sometimes referred to as "Enterprise 2.0", a term derived from Web 2.0, this generally refers to the use of social computing in corporate intranets and in other medium- and large-scale business environments. It consisted of a class of tools that allowed for networking and social changes to businesses at the time. It was a layering of the business tools on Web 2.0 and brought forth several applications and collaborative software with specific uses.

FinanceElectronic negotiation, which first came up in 1969 and was adapted over time to suit financial markets networking needs, represents an important and desirable coordination mechanism for electronic markets. Negotiation between agents (software agents as well as humans) allows cooperative and competitive sharing of information to determine a proper price. Recent research and practice has also shown that electronic negotiation is beneficial for the coordination of complex interactions among organizations. Electronic negotiation has recently emerged as a very dynamic, interdisciplinary research area covering aspects from disciplines such as Economics, Information Systems, Computer Science, Communication Theory, Sociology and Psychology.Social computing has become more widely known because of its relationship to a number of recent trends. These include the growing popularity of social software and Web 3.0, increased academic interest in social network analysis, the rise of open source as a viable method of production, and a growing conviction that all of this can have a profound impact on daily life. A February 13, 2006 paper by market research company Forrester Research suggested that:

Theoretical foundations 
Socially intelligent computing is a new term that refers to the recent efforts of individuals to understand the ways in which systems of people and computers will prove useful as intermediaries between people and tools used by people. These systems result in new behaviors that occur as a result of the complex interaction between humans and computers and can be explained by several different areas of science. The Foundations of Social Computing are deeply vested in the understanding of social psychology and cyberpsychology. Social psychology covers topics such as decision making, persuasion, group behavior, personal attraction, and factors that promote health and well-being. Cognitive sciences also play a huge role in understanding Social computing and human behavior on networking elements driven by personal needs/means. Sociology is also a factor since overall environments decide how individuals choose to interact.

There are multiple areas of social computing that have been able to expand the threshold of knowledge in this discipline.  Each area has been able to have a focus and goal behind it that provides us with a deeper understanding of the social behavior between users that interact using some variation of social computing.

Social software 
Social software can be any computational system that supports social interactions among groups of people. The following are examples of such systems.

Social media 
Social media has become an outlet that is one of the most widely used ways of interacting through computers and mobile phones. Though there are many different platforms that can be used for social media, they all serve the same primary purpose of creating a social interaction through computers, mobile devices, etc. Social media has evolved into not just an interaction through text, but through pictures, videos, GIFs, and many other forms of multimedia.  This has provided users an enhanced way to interact with other users while being able to more widely express and share during computational interaction.  Within the last couple decades, social media has blown up and created many famous applications within the social computing arena. These sites also serve as digital marketing platforms, which is growing rapidly.

Social networking 
Through social networking, people are able to use platforms to build or enhance social networks/relations among people.  These are people who commonly share similar backgrounds, interests, or participate in the same activities.  For more details see social networking service.

Wiki pages 
A wiki provides computing users a chance to collaborate to come together with a common goal and provide content to the public; both novice and expert users.  Through the collaboration and efforts of many, a wiki page has no limit for the number of improvements that can be made.

Blogs 

A blog, in social computing aspects, is more a way for people to follow a particular user, group, or company and comment on the progress toward the particular ideal being covered in the blog. This allows users to interact using the content that is provided by page admin as the main subject.

Five of the best blogging platforms include Tumblr, WordPress, Squarespace, Blogger, and Posterous. These sites enable users, whether it be a person, company, or organization, to express certain ideas, thoughts, and/or opinions on either a single or variety of subjects. There are also a new technology called webloging which are sites that hosts blogs such as Myspace and Xanga. Both blogs and weblogging are very similar in that they act as a form of social computing where they help form social relations through one another such as gaining followers, trending using hashtags, or commenting on a post providing an opinion on a blog.

According to a study conducted by Rachael Kwai Fun IP and Christian Wagner, some features of weblogs that attract users and support blogs and weblogs as an important aspect of social computing in forming and strengthening relationships are: content management tools, community building tools, time structuring, search by category, commentary, and the ability to secure closed blogs.

Blogs are also highly used in social computing concepts in order to understand human behaviors amongst online communities through a concept called social network analysis. Social network analysis (SNA) is "a discipline of social science that seeks to explain social phenomena through a structural interpretation of human interaction both as a theory and a methodology". There are certain links that occur in blogs, weblogs in this case, where they have different functions that portray different types of information such as Permalink, Blogrolls, Comments, and Trackbacks.

Online gaming 
Online gaming is the social behavior of using an online game while interacting with other users.  Online gaming can be done using a multitude of different platforms; common ones include personal computers, Xbox, PlayStation, and many more gaming consoles that can be stationary or mobile. Many of these applications include messaging between users.

Online dating 
Online dating has created a community of websites like OkCupid, eHarmony, and Match.com.  These platforms provide users with a way to interact with others that have goals relating to creating new relationships.  The interaction between users in sites like these will differ based on the platform but the goal is simple; create relationships through online social interaction. People can meet more possible companions through online dating websites than they could at work or in their neighborhood.

Socially intelligent computing 
Groups of people interact with these social computing systems in a variety of ways, all of which may be described as socially intelligent computing.

Crowdsourcing 
Crowdsourcing consists of a group of participants that work collaboratively either for pay or as volunteers to produce a good or service. Crowdsourcing platforms like Amazon Mechanical Turk allow individuals to perform simple tasks that can be accumulated into a larger project.

Dark social media 
The Dark social media is the social media tools used to collaborate between individuals where contents are supposed to be only available to the participants. However, unlike mobile phone calls or messaging where information is sent from one user, transmitted through a medium and stored on each user devices, with the medium having no storage permission of the actual content of the data, more and more communication methods include a centralized server where all the contents are received, stored, and then transmitted. Some examples of these new mechanisms include Google Doc, Facebook Messages or Snapchat. All of the information passes through these channels has largely been unaccounted for by users themselves and the data analytics. However, in addition to their respective users private companies (Facebook, Twitter, Snapchat) that provided these services do have complete control over such data. The number of images, links, referrals and information pass through digital is supposed to be completely unaccounted for in the marketing scheme of things.

Social science theories

Collective intelligence 
Collective intelligence is considered an area of social computing because of the group collaboration aspect.  Becoming a growing area in computer science, collective intelligence provides users with a way to gain knowledge through collective efforts in a social interactive environment.

Social perceptions 
Recent research has begun to look at interactions between humans and their computers in groups. This line of research focuses on the interaction as the primary unit of analysis by drawing from fields such as psychology, social psychology, and sociology.

Current research 
Since 2007, research in social computing has become more popular for researchers and professionals in multiple fields dealing with technology, business and politics. A study performed by affiliates of Washington State University used a Latent semantic analysis on academic papers containing the term "social computing" to find that topics in social computing converge into the three major themes of Knowledge Discovery, Knowledge Sharing and Content Management. Social computing continues to shift the direction of research in Information Sciences as a whole, extending social aspects into technological and corporate domains. Companies and industries such as Google, Cisco and Fox have invested in such endeavors. Possible questions to be answered through social computing research include how to form stable communities, how these communities evolve, how knowledge is created and processed, how people are motivated to participate, etc.

Currently, research in the areas of social computing is being done by many well known labs owned by Microsoft and Massachusetts Institute of Technology. The team at Microsoft has taken off with a mission statement of "To research and develop software that contributes to compelling and effective social interactions."  They take a main focus on user-centered design processes.  They also add rapid prototyping combined with rigorous science to bring forth complete projects and research that can impact the social computing field.  Current projects being worked on by the Microsoft team include Hotmap, SNARF, Slam, and Wallop.  MIT, however, has a goal of creating software that shapes our cities and more in depth:"More specifically, (1) we create micro-institutions in physical space, (2) we design social processes that allow others to replicate and evolve those micro-institutions, and (3) we write software that enables those social processes.  We use this process to create more robust, decentralized, human-scale systems in our cities. We are particularly focused on reinventing our current systems for learning, agriculture, and transportation."The current research projects at the MIT social computing lab include The Dog Programming Language, Wildflower Montessori, and You Are Here.  A broad overview of what to expect from newly started Wildflower Montessori is as follows:"Wildflower Montessori School is a pilot Lab School and the first in a new network of learning centers. Its aim is to be an experiment in a new learning environment, blurring the boundaries between coffee shops and schools, between home-schooling and institutional schooling, between tactile, multisensory methods and abstract thinking. Wildflower will serve as a research platform to test new ideas in advancing the Montessori Method in the context of modern fluencies, as well as to test how to direct the organic growth of a social system that fosters the growth and connection of such schools."

Conferences 
 Computer-supported cooperative work (CSCW)
 SIGCHI

See also

 Computer-mediated communication
 Game theory
 Folksonomy
 Groupware
 Human-based computation
 Human-centered computing
 Multi-agent system
 Open innovation
 Social choice
 Social machine
 Social network
 Social software engineering
 Sociology
 Symbiotic intelligence
 Web 2.0
 Research institutions
 MIT Media Lab
 Cosmos Lab
 GroupLens Research
 HCII

References
 Introduction to Computational Social Science: Principles and Applications . textbook by Claudio Cioffi-Revilla
Published at December 31,2013.page 2,3

External links
 Peer-reviewed overview of Social Computing by Tom Erickson (IBM Research) and Elizabeth Churchill (Yahoo! Research)
 Social Machines - Computing means connecting - Wade Roush, MIT Technology Review, August 2005
 Microsoft Research - Social Computing Group Home
 IBM Research Social Computing Group
 University of Lincoln Social Computing Research Centre
 iCrossing ebook What is Social Media? - Antony Mayfield, 2007
 You Are Here: Social Computing Snapshots
 Socially Intelligent Computing Talk
 Social Computing, special edition of the Communications of the ACM, edited by Douglas Schuler, Volume 37, Issue 1 (January 1994), Pages: 28 - 108
 Theoretical foundations of Social Computation

Social media
Cyberpsychology
Persuasion
Crowdsourcing